Aq Bolagh-e Rostam Khani (also Romanized as Āq Bolāgh-e Rostam Khānī; also known as Āq Bolāgh-e Rostam Khān) is a village in Sharqi Rural District of the Central District of Ardabil County, Ardabil province, Iran. At the 2006 census, its population was 1,827 in 372 households. The following census in 2011 counted 1,945 people in 582 households. The latest census in 2016 showed a population of 1,929 people in 605 households; it is the largest village in its rural district.

References 

Ardabil County

Towns and villages in Ardabil County

Populated places in Ardabil Province

Populated places in Ardabil County